Ye Olde White Harte is a public house in Hull, England.  It was built around 1660 in the Artisan Mannerist style but did not become a pub until the 1730s.  In the aftermath of the Glorious Revolution of 1688 it was the site of a successful plot to remove the Catholic Governor of Hull.  The pub was remodelled in 1881 in the Romantic style with extensive alteration to the interior and façade.  At least two residents have suffered fatal accidents in the pub and it is reputed to be "one of Hull's most haunted".

Description 
Ye Olde White Harte is sited in Silver Street in Old Town, Hull, but faces a courtyard between that street and Bowlalley Lane.  An alleyway connects the two streets and provides access to the pub.  A billiards room is built over the alleyway to the north of the courtyard. To the east and west of the courtyard are late 18th- or early 19th-century brick buildings.

The earliest part of the current structure dates to around 1660 and is constructed of red brick, with its upper floors painted in a light colour.  The façade, facing into the courtyard, is of six bays.  The entrance is in the third bay from the left and is slightly projecting, with a lead-glazed door with an oval-shaped overlight and pediment.  The windows are square-headed with a keystone detail.  At the top of the ground floor is a prominent cornice detail.  The first floor has 12-pane sash windows except for the bay above the entrance which has a taller single-light window.  The attic floor has a single square window and the roof has pantiles.

The ground floor consists of two bars set either side of a staircase.  The interior dates largely to the late 19th century and each bar contains a large brick-built fireplace.  The dog-legged stair case is partly original with 19th-century additions.  The first floor contains two rooms used as a restaurant.  The walls are wood panelled, including some 17th-century details, and there is a 17th-century panel door.  A window in the landing depicts, in stained glass, Sir John Hotham, 1st Baronet, the Governor of Hull from 1641.

History 
There was a house on the site in 1550 but the current structure was built around 1660 in the Artisan Mannerist style by local architect William Catlyn.  A local myth, believed to have started in the 19th century and since disproven, claims the pub was where Governor Sir John Hotham plotted to start the English Civil War. One of the upstairs rooms is known as the "Plotting Room" because of the myth, which states it was where he planned to refuse King Charles I access to the town, beginning the Siege of Hull, the first engagement of the war.

The structure was the location of another plot, made in the aftermath of the Glorious Revolution of November 1688 when the protestant William III deposed the Catholic James II.  A room in the house was used by the Protestant Deputy-Governor of Hull to plot the overthrow of the Governor Marmaduke Langdale, 2nd Baron Langdale, a Catholic who had been appointed by James II.  Langdale was successfully removed, in an event known in Hull as Town Taking Day.

The structure became a pub in the 1730s.  In April 1806 the 26-year-old daughter of the landlord suffered fatal burns when her clothing caught fire while lighting the fireplace in the main bar.  The pub was remodelled by local architects Smith & Broderick in 1881.  This included works to the façade.  Internally the works were Romantic in style and intended to imitate the appearance of a 17th-century inn. Internal timbers of the building show evidence of fire damage dating to 1883.  In April 1912 the landlady of the pub passed out at the top of the stairs.  She fell and broke her neck, leading to her death.

The pub was granted statutory protection when it was designated a grade II* listed building on 13 October 1952.  The site is said to be "one of Hull's most haunted pubs", according to HullLive, and the bar displays a skull of unknown provenance.

An application to make internal alterations was refused in 2017 after objections by Historic England.  Some of the proposed alterations, including removal of a servery (a food service counter), were later made without consent.  A complaint was made to Hull City Council by pub and ale campaign group CAMRA and an investigation led to the owners stating that the servery had been sent for restoration and would be reinstalled.

References 

Grade II* listed buildings in the East Riding of Yorkshire
Buildings and structures completed in the 1660s
Grade II* listed pubs in England
Historic buildings in Kingston upon Hull